Justin Mooijer (born 9 April 1992), known by the stage name Janey Jacké, is a Dutch drag queen, actor and presenter, most known for competing in the first season of Drag Race Holland (2020) and a spin-off season known as RuPaul's Drag Race: UK vs the World (2022).

Career
At age 16, Mooijer dressed up as a woman for the first time during a classmate's birthday party.

In 2012, Mooijer completed his education at the Da Costa hotel school, for which he did internships at various hotels. After five years of working at Michelin restaurants and five-star hotels, he started a professional career as Janey Jacké.

On 9 September 2020, Janey Jacké was announced as one of ten cast members of the debut season of Drag Race Holland. Jacké made it to the finals and became runner-up.

On 17 January 2022, she was announced as one of the nine contestants on RuPaul's Drag Race: UK vs the World, ultimately placing 5th..

Personal life 
Mooijer was born in Purmerend and grew up in Volendam. He is now based in Amsterdam.

Discography

Singles

As lead artist

As featured artist

Filmography

Television

Film

Music videos

Web series

Awards and nominations

References

External links 
 

1992 births
Living people
Drag Race Holland contestants
Dutch drag queens
People from Purmerend